Charles Henry Turner (May 26, 1861 – August 31, 1913) was a U.S. Representative from New York.

Biography
Born in Wentworth, New Hampshire, Turner attended the common schools before moving to New York City in November 1879. He attended Columbia College there from 1886 to 1888, the year in which he unsuccessfully ran for State senator.

Turner was elected as a Democrat to the Fifty-first Congress to fill the vacancy caused by the resignation of Frank T. Fitzgerald and served from December 9, 1889, to March 3, 1891. He was not a candidate for renomination in 1890.
Turner then served as Doorkeeper of the United States House of Representatives from 1891 to 1893.

Having studied Law, Turner was admitted to the bar in 1897 and commenced practice in Washington, D.C.
He was appointed assistant district attorney for the District of Columbia on July 16, 1903, and served until his resignation on September 1, 1911. Soon after, on November 27, 1911, he was appointed as special assistant to the United States attorney for the District of Columbia, a position which he held until his death on August 31, 1913, in Wentworth, New Hampshire. He was interred in Wentworth Cemetery.

References

External links
 

1861 births
1913 deaths
Democratic Party members of the United States House of Representatives from New York (state)
Employees of the United States House of Representatives
19th-century American politicians
People from Grafton County, New Hampshire
Columbia College (New York) alumni
Lawyers from Washington, D.C.
19th-century American lawyers